This is a list of newspapers circulated in Missouri.This is a list of daily newspapers currently published in Missouri. For weekly newspapers, see List of newspapers in Missouri.

Current news publications
 Belle Banner - Belle
 Bland Courier - Bland
 Boonville Daily News - Boonville
 Bowling Green Times - Bowling Green
 California Democrat - California
 Camdenton Lake Sun - Camdenton
 Chronicle Herald - Macon
 Columbia Daily Tribune - Columbia
 Columbia Missourian - Columbia
 Constitution Tribune - Chillicothe
 Delta Dunklin Democrat - Kennett
 Focus on Oak Grove - Oak Grove
 Hannibal Courier-Post - Hannibal
 Independence Examiner - Independence
 Jefferson City News Tribune - Jefferson City
 Joplin Globe - Joplin
 Kirksville Daily Express - Kirksville
 Lake Sun Leader - Camdenton
 Lincoln County Journal - Troy
 Marshall Democrat-News - Marshall
 Maryville Daily Forum - Maryville
 Missouri Free Press - Diggins
 Moberly Monitor Index - Moberly
 Mound City News - Mound City
 Neosho Daily News - Neosho
 North Cass Herald - Belton
 Parkland News - Farmington
 Rich Hill Mining Review - Rich Hill
 Riverfront Times - St. Louis
 Rolla Daily News - Rolla
 Sedalia Democrat - Sedalia
 South County Times - Crestwood, Sunset Hills, Affton, Sappington Concord Village, and Fenton
 Southeast Missourian - Cape Girardeau
 Springfield News-Leader - Springfield
 St. Joseph News-Press - St. Joseph,
 St. Louis Globe-Democrat - St. Louis
 St. Louis Intelligencer - St. Louis
 St. Louis Post-Dispatch - St. Louis
 St. Louis Reveille - St. Louis
 The Beacon (Kansas City) - Kansas City metropolitan area
 The Carthage Press - Carthage
 The Daily Guide - Waynesville The Daily Star-Journal - Warrensburg
 The Kaleidoscope Weekly - St. James
 The Kansas City Star - Kansas City
 The Leader - Festus
 The Lebanon Daily Record - Lebanon
 The Mexico Ledger - Mexico
 The New Evening Whirl - St. Louis
 The Odessan - Odessa
 Tipton Times - Tipton
 Trenton Republican-Times - Trenton
 Washington Missourian - Washington
 Webster-Kirkwood Times - Webster Groves, Kirkwood,  Shrewsbury, Oakland,  Des Peres, Warson Woods, Glendale, and Rock Hill.
 West End Word - St. Louis

See also
 List of newspapers
 List of newspapers in the United States by circulation
 List of defunct newspapers of the United States#Missouri
 List of African-American newspapers in Missouri

References

External links
 . (Survey of local news existence and ownership in 21st century)

Missouri
Newspapers